The  (J/psi) meson  or psion is a subatomic particle, a flavor-neutral meson consisting of a charm quark and a charm antiquark. Mesons formed by a bound state of a charm quark and a charm anti-quark are generally known as "charmonium". The  is the most common form of charmonium, due to its spin of 1 and its low rest mass. This lifetime was about a thousand times longer than expected.

Its discovery was made independently by two research groups, one at the Stanford Linear Accelerator Center, headed by Burton Richter, and one at the Brookhaven National Laboratory, headed by Samuel Ting of MIT. They discovered they had actually found the same particle, and both announced their discoveries on 11 November 1974. The importance of this discovery is highlighted by the fact that the subsequent, rapid changes in high-energy physics at the time have become collectively known as the "November Revolution". Richter and Ting were awarded the 1976 Nobel Prize in Physics.

Background to discovery
In the 1960s, the first quark models of elementary particle physics were proposed, which said that protons, neutrons, and all other baryons, and also all mesons, are made from fractionally charged particles, the "quarks", which come in six types or "flavors", called up, down, top, [[bottom quark|bottom]], strange and charm. Despite the ability of quark models to bring order to the "elementary particle zoo", they were considered something like mathematical fiction at the time, a simple artifact of deeper physical reasons.

Starting in 1969, deep inelastic scattering experiments at SLAC revealed surprising experimental evidence for particles inside of protons. Whether these were quarks or something else was not known at first. Many experiments were needed to fully identify the properties of the sub-protonic components. To a first approximation, they indeed were a match for the previously described quarks.

On the theoretical front, gauge theories with broken symmetry became the first fully viable contenders for explaining the weak interaction after Gerardus 't Hooft discovered in 1971 how to calculate with them beyond tree level. The first experimental evidence for these electroweak unification theories was the discovery of the weak neutral current in 1973. Gauge theories with quarks became a viable contender for the strong interaction in 1973, when the concept of asymptotic freedom was identified.

However, a naive mixture of electroweak theory and the quark model led to calculations about known decay modes that contradicted observation: In particular, it predicted Z boson-mediated flavor-changing decays of a strange quark into a down quark, which were not observed. A 1970 idea of Sheldon Glashow, John Iliopoulos, and Luciano Maiani, known as the GIM mechanism, showed that the flavor-changing decays would be strongly suppressed if there were a fourth quark (now called the charm quark) that was a complementary counterpart to the strange quark. By summer 1974 this work had led to theoretical predictions of what a charm + anticharm meson would be like.

The predictions were ignored. The work of Richter and Ting was done mostly to explore new energy regimes, not to test the theoretical predictions.

The group at Brookhaven,
were the first to discern a peak at 3.1 GeV in plots of production rates, first recognizing the ψ meson – that Ting named the "J" meson (after himself – his last-name written in Chinese is 丁
– or maybe not after himself).

Decay modes
This effect strongly increases the lifetime of the particle and thereby gives it its very narrow decay width of just . Because of this strong suppression, electromagnetic decays begin to compete with hadronic decays. This is why the  has a significant branching fraction to leptons.

The primary decay modes are:

  melting 
This is one of the predicted signals of the formation of the quark–gluon plasma. Heavy-ion experiments at CERN's Super Proton Synchrotron and at BNL's Relativistic Heavy Ion Collider have studied this phenomenon without a conclusive outcome as of 2009. Thus, there is uncertainty in the prevailing conditions at the initial collisions.

Name

Richter named it "SP", after the SPEAR accelerator used at SLAC; however, none of his coworkers liked that name. After consulting with Greek-born Leo Resvanis to see which Greek letters were still available, and rejecting "iota" because its name implies insignificance, Richter chose "psi"a name which, as Gerson Goldhaber pointed out, contains the original name "SP", but in reverse order. Coincidentally, later spark chamber pictures often resembled the psi shape. Ting assigned the name "J" to it, which is one letter away from "K", the name of the already-known strange meson; another reason is that "j" is the symbol for electromagnetic current. Possibly by coincidence, "J" strongly resembles the Chinese character for Ting's name (丁 Dīng). J is also the first letter of Ting's eldest daughter's name, Jeanne.

Much of the scientific community considered it unjust to give one of the two discoverers priority, so most subsequent publications have referred to the particle as the "".

Other vector charm–anticharm states are denoted similarly with ψ and the quantum state (if known) or the mass. The "J" is not used, since Richter's group alone first found excited states.

This is by analogy with positronium, which also consists of a particle and its antiparticle (an electron and positron in the case of positronium).

See also
 OZI rule
 List of multiple discoveries

Footnotes

References

Sources

Mesons
Onia
History of physics
Subatomic particles with spin 1